"It's Complicated" is the third single from A Day to Remember's fourth album, What Separates Me from You, released on October 25, 2011.

Music and lyrics
Lead vocalist, Jeremy McKinnon wrote the lyrics, while the music was written by himself, guitarists Kevin Skaff and Neil Westfall, and A Day to Remember.

Release and performances
The song, along with 3 others from the album, was mixed by David Bendeth. In September 2011, it was revealed that "It's Complicated" would be released as the third single from the album on October 25, though it was only released as a radio single. "It's Complicated " charted on Billboards Hot Modern Rock Tracks chart, at number 34. The band played an acoustic version of "It's Complicated" for MTV on February 14, 2012. "It's Complicated" is available to play on the Rock Band games.

Liz Ramanand from Loudwire said the song had "catchy guitar riffs" and the song's style being "a poppy punk feel". Ramanand also called the song an "anthem for the brokenhearted" that "will get fists pumping" and the chorus "very appealing".

Track listing
Digital download
"It's Complicated" – 2:57

Promotional CD
"It's Complicated (Radio Edit)" – 2:46
"It's Complicated (Album Version)" – 2:57

Chart positions

Personnel
Personnel per album booklet.

A Day to Remember
Jeremy McKinnon — vocals
Joshua Woodard — bass
Neil Westfall — rhythm guitar
Alex Shelnutt — drums 
Kevin Skaff — lead guitar, backing vocals

Production
Chad Gilbert — producer
Andrew Wade and Jeremy McKinnon — co-producers
David Bendeth — mixing engineer
Ted Jensen — mastering engineer
Andrew Wade — engineer

References

A Day to Remember songs
2011 singles
Song recordings produced by Andrew Wade
Song recordings produced by Chad Gilbert
Songs written by Jeremy McKinnon
Song recordings produced by Jeremy McKinnon
Victory Records singles